Wangie is a town in the local government area of the Shire of Buloke, Victoria, Australia.

References